is the 15th single by Japanese singer/songwriter Mari Hamada, from the album Anti-Heroine. Written by Hamada and Hiroyuki Ohtsuki, the single was released by MCA Victor on January 27, 1993. It was used as the theme song of the Fuji TV drama series . The song was also included in Hamada's international album Introducing... Mari Hamada.

The B-side, "Anti-Heroine", was used as the ending theme of the MBS travel series .

The single peaked at No. 6 on Oricon's singles chart, becoming her last top-10 single. It was also certified Gold by the RIAJ.

Track listing

Personnel 
 Michael Landau – guitar
 Craig Stull – acoustic guitar
 Brett Garsed – acoustic guitar
 Leland Sklar – bass
 Paul Mirkovich – keyboards
 Mike Baird – drums
 Steve Klong – percussion

Chart positions

Certification

References

External links 
 
 

1993 singles
1993 songs
Japanese-language songs
Japanese television drama theme songs
Mari Hamada songs
Universal Music Japan singles